Antonia Gransden (1928 – 18 January 2020), English historian and medievalist, was Reader in Medieval History at the University of Nottingham. She was author of works in medieval historiography, including the massive two-volume study Historical Writing in England, covering a thousand years of historical writing from the 6th to the 16th century.

Work at the British Museum fuelled her fascination with the Abbey of Bury St Edmunds. She then went on to edit the records of the abbey, resulting in a two-volume History of the Abbey of Bury St Edmonds, which she completed aged 86.

Life
Gransden was born Antonia Morland. Educated at Dartington Hall and Somerville College, Oxford, she gained a first class degree and studied for a PhD. She married Ken Gransden in 1957 and the couple had two daughters. However, the marriage was dissolved in 1977.

Antonia Gransden was a long-standing member of the Labour Party, and an advocate for women's rights to education, equal pay and opportunities. She died on 18 January 2020 at the age of 91.

Select bibliography

 A History of the Abbey of Bury St Edmunds, 1257-1301. Simon of Luton and John of Northwold (Woodbridge: Boydell and Brewer, 2015)
 (ed.) The Letter-Book of William of Hoo: Sacrist of Bury St Edmunds, 1280–1294 (Ipswich: Suffolk Records Society, 1963)
 (ed. & trans.) The Chronicle of Bury St Edmunds 1212–1301 (London; Edinburgh: Nelson, 1964)
 (ed.) The Customary of the Benedictine Abbey of Bury St. Edmunds in Suffolk: (from Harleian MS. 1005 in the British Museum) (Henry Bradshaw Society, 1973)
 Historical Writing in England, c.550 to c.1307 (London: Routledge and Kegan Paul, 1974)
 Historical Writing in England, c.1307 to the Early Sixteenth Century (London: Routledge and Kegan Paul, 1982)
 Legends, Traditions, and History in Medieval England (London: Hambledon Press, 1992)

References

1928 births
2020 deaths
Academics of the University of Nottingham
Alumni of Somerville College, Oxford
British medievalists
Women medievalists
English historians
British women historians